Fran Wilde is an American science fiction and fantasy writer and blogger. Her debut novel, Updraft, was nominated for the 2016 Nebula Award, and won the 2016 Andre Norton Award and the 2016 Compton Crook Award. Her debut middle grade novel, Riverland, won the 2019 Andre Norton Award, was named an NPR Best Book of 2019  and was a Lodestar Finalist. Wilde is the first person to win two Andre Norton Awards for Middle Grade and Young Adult Fiction. Her short fiction has appeared in Asimov's Science Fiction, Nature, Tor.com, Uncanny Magazine, and elsewhere. Her fiction explores themes of social class, disability, disruptive technology, and empowerment against a backdrop of engineering and artisan culture.

Early life
Wilde was born in Philadelphia, Pennsylvania in 1972. She attended the University of Virginia, earning a BA in English with honors in 1994. She then went on to earn a MFA in poetry from Warren Wilson College in 1996 and a master's degree in information architecture and interaction design from the University of Baltimore in 2001.

Career
Prior to publishing, Wilde worked as a sailing instructor, a jeweler's assistant, a teacher and professor, and a web and game developer.

Her first published novel grew from a short story she developed for the 2011 Viable Paradise writing workshop. She has published a number of short stories and completed several novels. She writes for the blog GeekMom and runs the blog and podcast Cooking the Books. She attended Taos Toolbox in 2012 and served as an Endeavor Award judge in 2015, and a Norton Jury Member in 2016.

Wilde is the writer and creator of the podcast called Machina produced by Realm. The audio drama was a twelve episode series that followed the fictional story of two companies competing to bring artificial intelligence to Mars.

Wilde is the Director of the Genre Fiction MFA Concentration at Western Colorado University.

Her debut novel, Updraft, was the first novel to be simultaneously nominated for a Nebula and Norton. Her work has been a finalist for six Nebula Awards, three Hugo Awards, two Locus Awards, a World Fantasy Award, and a Lodestar.

Wilde is a member of the Science Fiction and Fantasy Writers of America.

Personal life
Wilde lives and works in Philadelphia, PA with her family.

Bibliography

Novels

Novels

Short fiction 

Short Stories

Non-fiction 
"Domestic violence and teaching my daughter to always rescue herself first," Washington Post (February 15, 2018)
"We Will See You Now," Uncanny Magazine (2018)
"Monsters and Magic can help kids through tough times. Here's how." Washington Post (August 9, 2016)
"Why are all the moms gone? A parent/writer tries to find herself in children's literature," Washington Post (August 31, 2015)
"Mom and daughter on reading together," Washington Post (July 2, 2014)

References

External links
 
 
 
 On staying ahead of evolving technology
 Geek of the Week: Fran Wilde
 Catching Fran Wilde on the Updraft
 Debut Tor Authors Play 'Would You Rather, SFF Edition" with John Scalzi

1972 births
Living people
21st-century American novelists
21st-century American short story writers
21st-century American women writers
American science fiction writers
American women novelists
American women short story writers
Asimov's Science Fiction people
Novelists from Pennsylvania
University of Baltimore alumni
Warren Wilson College alumni
Writers from Philadelphia